Shimabara Lullaby ( or Shimabara no komoriuta) is a folk song-like lullaby by Kohei Miyazaki of Shimabara, Nagasaki Prefecture, Japan.

General

Shimabara Lullaby was written in the early 1950s by Kohei Miyazaki (1917-1980). It is related to the Karayuki-san, the poor Japanese girls sold to work overseas as prostitutes, in Southern China and the Pacific island areas, such as  Sandakan on Borneo.

This song became famous when Chiyoko Shimakura recorded it in 1957, followed later the recordings by Peggy Hayama, Hisaya Morishige and others.

Lyrics

The original song had five stanzas, but is usually sung in three stanzas, the first of which starts with:

Japanese
おどみゃ島原の　おどみゃ島原の

Romanized Japanese
Odomya shimabara no, odomya shimabara no,

English translation
I was born in Shimabara, I was born in Shimabara,

The lyrics cannot be fully listed for copyright reason.

See also

 Lullaby
 Folk song
 Other Japanese lullabies: Edo Lullaby, Itsuki Lullaby, Takeda Lullaby, Chugoku Region Lullaby, etc.

References

External links
 Shimabara Lullaby（(A Hundred Lullabies in Japanese, in Japan Society of Lullabies' home page) 

Lullabies
Japanese folk songs
Culture in Nagasaki Prefecture